Villaronga is a surname. Notable people with the surname include:

Agustí Villaronga (born 1953), Spanish film director, screenwriter and actor
Mariano Villaronga-Toro (1906 1987), Puerto Rican educator
Raúl G. Villaronga (born 1938–2021), Puerto Rican politician and military officer

See also
Casa Wiechers-Villaronga, mansion in Ponce, Puerto Rico